The Bank of Anniston was a bank in Anniston, Alabama that failed in 1898.  Its headquarters building, at 1005 Noble St. in Anniston, was built in 1888 and was listed on the National Register of Historic Places in 1985.

It was deemed "significant as a notable example, in Anniston, of a small Victorian neoclassical commercial building particularly distinguished by the use of stone ornamentation."  It is one of few historic commercial buildings on Noble Street which survived "moderization" of the downtown area in the 1940s and later.

It was home of "Couch's Jewelers" in 1984.

See also
Caldwell Building, adjacent, also NRHP-listed

References

External links

		
National Register of Historic Places in Calhoun County, Alabama
Neoclassical architecture in Alabama
Buildings and structures completed in 1888